Ammar Belhani (born 27 October 1971, in Aïn El Kebira) is an Algerian international retired footballer.

International career
On December 5, 2000, Belhani made his debut for the Algerian National Team in a 3-2 friendly win against Romania.

External links
 

1971 births
Living people
Algerian footballers
Algeria international footballers
ES Sétif players
CS Constantine players
Algerian Ligue Professionnelle 1 players
People from Aïn El Kebira
AS Khroub players
Association football goalkeepers
21st-century Algerian people